Iran participated in the 2010 Asian Games in Guangzhou, China on 12–27 November 2010.

Competitors

Medal summary

Medal table

Medalists

Results by event

Aquatics

Diving

Men

Swimming

Men

Archery

Men's recurve

Women's recurve

Athletics

Men

Women

Basketball

Men

Board games

Chess

Men

Women

Boxing

Men

Canoeing

Slalom
Men

Sprint
Men

Women

Cue sports

Men

Cycling

Road

Men

Track

Men

Dragon boat

Men

Women

Fencing

Men

Football

Men

Gymnastics

Artistic

Men

Handball

Men

Judo

Men

Women

Kabaddi

Men

Women

Karate

Men's kumite

Women's kumite

Roller sports

Speed

Men

Women

Rowing

Men

Women

Sailing

Men

Women

Open

Shooting

Men

Women

Table tennis

Men

Taekwondo

Men

Women

Volleyball

Beach

Men

Indoor

Men

Weightlifting

Men

Wrestling

Men's freestyle

Men's Greco-Roman

Wushu

Men's taolu

Men's sanda

Women's sanda

References

External links
 2010 Asian Games official website

Nations at the 2010 Asian Games
2010
Asian Games